Turkey took part in the Eurovision Song Contest 1985. The country was represented by a music trio named Mazhar Fuat Özkan (names of the members) with the song "Didai didai dai" written by Mazhar Alanson (Mazhar) and composed by the trio.

Before Eurovision

9. Eurovision Şarkı Yarışması Türkiye Finali 
The final took place on 1 March 1985 at the Istanbul Atatürk Kültür Merkezi in Istanbul, hosted by Başak Doğru and Orhan Boran. Nine songs competed and the winner was determined by an expert jury.

At Eurovision 
On the night of the contest Mahzar Fuat Özkan performed 7th in the running order following France and preceding Belgium. The name of the trio was announced as MFÖ (abbreviated for Mahzar Fuat Özkan) and the name of the song as "Didai didai dai". The song was also arranged for the big orchestra by Garo Mafyan. At the close of the voting Didai Didai Dai had received 36 points placing Turkey 14th. 8 participants had voted for Didai Didai Dai. The Turkish jury awarded its 12 points to Spain.

Voting

References

1985
Countries in the Eurovision Song Contest 1985
Eurovision